All's Well, Ends Well Too (花田喜事) is a 1993 Hong Kong comedy film directed by Clifton Ko, and released as comedy fare as is the usual custom to entertain movie-goers on the Lunar New Year celebrations. The main setting is in the Song Dynasty and this reflects in the period costumes and architecture.

All's Well, Ends Well Too is part of a series of similarly titled films, together with All's Well, Ends Well (1992), of which it is not a sequel, All's Well, Ends Well 1997 (1997), All's Well, Ends Well 2009 (2009), and the similarly themed All's Well, Ends Well 2010 (2010).

Synopsis

This comedy follows in tune with the series of films of the same name. Chow Tung (Samuel Hui) is a licentious man who was arranged to get married along with his ugly sister Gut (Sandra Ng) to partners not of their choice. Chow, being a filial son, agrees to go along with his mother's (Ricky Hui) plans. The plot thickens when Chow meets the beautiful Snow White (Rosamund Kwan) and decides to marry her of which Matriarch Chow agrees whole-heartedly. Unknown to them, Snow White's magician lover, David Cooper Feel (Leslie Cheung) schemes a plan and Chow Tung was married instead to Jinx (Teresa Mo).

The entire film uses mistaken identity as its central theme for comic effect, this theme is repeated for All's Well, Ends Well Too 2010.

Cast
 Samuel Hui as Chow Tung
 Leslie Cheung as David Copper Feel (a parody of magician David Copperfield)
 Rosamund Kwan as Snow White
 Teresa Mo as Jinx
 Sandra Ng as Gut
 Raymond Wong as Lam Ka-sing
 Ricky Hui as Matriarch Chow
 Ng Man-tat as Snow White's father
 Money Lo as Snow White's Servant
 James Wong as Magistrate
 Clifton Ko as Pimp
 Vincent Kok as Bo

Theme song
Happy Events Arriving Together (喜事齊來)
Composer: Samuel Hui
Lyricist: Raymond Wong
Singer: Ricky Hui

References

External links

1993 films
1990s Cantonese-language films
1993 comedy films
Hong Kong slapstick comedy films
Hong Kong sequel films
Films set in the Song dynasty
Films shot in Singapore
Films directed by Clifton Ko
1990s Hong Kong films